Alan David Austerman (born May 23, 1943) is an American politician who served as a member of the Alaska House of Representatives and Alaska Senate.

Early life and education 
Austerman was born in Everett, Washington. He graduated from Kodiak High School in 1961.

Career 
Austerman served as the Majority Leader of the Alaska House of Representatives. He also served on the Fisheries, Military and Veterans Affairs, and Community and Regional Affairs committees of the House of Representatives of the 27th Legislature. Alan Austerman previously served as an Alaska State Senator from 2001 to 2003. He resigned from the Senate to become the Fisheries Policy Advisor to Governor Frank Murkowski. Before that he represented the 6th district in the House from 1995 to 2001.

Austerman's daughter Carol ran for his seat in the House of Representatives upon his retirement in 2014. She lost in the Republican primary to Louise Stutes.

Personal life

Austerman and his wife, Ginny, and two children, Carol and Dawn.

He is the current owner of Alan Austerman Consulting and Lobbyist Services. He served from 1964 to 1971 in the Alaska National Guard achieving the rank of Sergeant. He has also served as Police Officer in the Kodiak Police Department and was also a Commercial Fisherman. He also published and co-owned the Kadiak Times newspaper at one point.

References

External links
 Alaska State House Majority Site
 Alaska State Legislature Biography
 Project Vote Smart profile
 Representative Austerman's Blog
 Alan Austerman at 100 Years of Alaska's Legislature

1943 births
Republican Party Alaska state senators
American fishers
American lobbyists
20th-century American newspaper publishers (people)
American police officers
Businesspeople from Alaska
Living people
Republican Party members of the Alaska House of Representatives
Military personnel from Alaska
People from Kodiak, Alaska
Politicians from Everett, Washington
United States Army officers